River Plate may refer to:

 Río de la Plata, a river and large estuary between Argentina and Uruguay
Río de la Plata Basin, the basin of the river
 Club Atlético River Plate, an Argentine sports club
 Club Atlético River Plate (women)
 Estadio Monumental Antonio Vespucio Liberti, also known as River Plate Stadium, in Buenos Aires, where the above team plays
Club River Plate (Asunción), a Paraguayan football club
Club Atlético River Plate Puerto Rico, a Puerto Rican football club
Club Atlético River Plate (Montevideo), a Uruguayan football club
Club Deportivo River Plate Ecuador, an Ecuadorian football club
River Plate F.C., a former Uruguayan football club
Sociedade Esportiva River Plate, a Brazilian football club
SV River Plate Aruba, an Aruban football club
 Viceroyalty of the Río de la Plata, a political entity in the Spanish Empire which contained the territories of present-day Argentina, Bolivia, Paraguay and Uruguay
 Rioplatense Spanish, also known as River Plate Spanish, a dialect of the Spanish language

See also
 Battle of the River Plate, in World War II
 The Battle of the River Plate (film), a film about the battle
Live at River Plate, a DVD by Australian rock band AC/DC
Platte River, a river in North America